The 1974 St. Louis Cardinals season was the team's 93rd season in St. Louis, Missouri and its 83rd season in the National League. The Cardinals went 86–75 during the season and finished second in the National League East, 1½ games behind the Pittsburgh Pirates.

Offseason
 October 26, 1973: Eddie Fisher was released by the St. Louis Cardinals.
 December 5, 1973: Tommie Agee was traded by the Cardinals to the Los Angeles Dodgers for Pete Richert.
 December 7, 1973: Diego Seguí, Reggie Cleveland and Terry Hughes were traded by the Cardinals to the Boston Red Sox for Lynn McGlothen, John Curtis, and Mike Garman.

Regular season
Outfielder Lou Brock led the NL with 118 stolen bases, breaking the modern-era (post-1898) MLB single-season mark of 104, set by Los Angeles Dodgers shortstop Maury Wills in 1962. He also broke the all-time National League record of 111 set by John Montgomery Ward in 1887, when stolen bases were counted differently. Brock broke Wills' record on September 10 in a game against the visiting Philadelphia Phillies. Brock's record still stands as the NL record, but Rickey Henderson of the Oakland Athletics broke the modern MLB mark in 1982, with 130 steals. The all-time MLB record was, and still is, held by Hugh Nicol, who stole 138, also in 1887, while playing in the American Association.

Outfielder Bake McBride won the Rookie of the Year Award this year, batting .309, with 6 home runs and 56 RBIs.

Season standings

Record vs. opponents

Notable transactions
 June 5, 1974: 1974 Major League Baseball Draft
Bill Caudill was drafted by the Cardinals in the 8th round. Player signed June 15, 1974.
Paul Molitor was drafted by the Cardinals in the 28th round, but did not sign.
 August 11, 1974: Steve Barber was signed as a free agent by the Cardinals.
 August 15, 1974: Ron Selak (minors) and a player to be named later were traded by the Cardinals to the Houston Astros for Claude Osteen. The Cardinals completed the trade by sending Dan Larson to the Astros on October 14.
 September 5, 1974: Ron Hunt was selected off waivers by the Cardinals from the Montreal Expos.

Roster

Player stats

Batting

Starters by position
Note: Pos = Position; G = Games played; AB = At bats; H = Hits; Avg. = Batting average; HR = Home runs; RBI = Runs batted in

Other batters
Note: G = Games played; AB = At bats; H = Hits; Avg. = Batting average; HR = Home runs; RBI = Runs batted in

Pitching

Starting pitchers
Note: G = Games pitched; IP = Innings pitched; W = Wins; L = Losses; ERA = Earned run average; SO = Strikeouts

Other pitchers
Note: G = Games pitched; IP = Innings pitched; W = Wins; L = Losses; ERA = Earned run average; SO = Strikeouts

Relief pitchers
Note: G = Games pitched; W = Wins; L = Losses; SV = Saves; ERA = Earned run average; SO = Strikeouts

Awards and honors

League leaders 
 Lou Brock, National League stolen base leader, 118

Farm system

LEAGUE CHAMPIONS: Tulsa

References

External links
1974 St. Louis Cardinals at Baseball Reference
1974 St. Louis Cardinals team page at www.baseball-almanac.com

St. Louis Cardinals seasons
Saint Louis Cardinals season
St Louis